Buprestomorpha montrouzieri is a species of beetle in the family Cerambycidae, and the only species in the genus Buprestomorpha. It was described by Thomson in 1860.

References

Tmesisternini
Beetles described in 1860